Amblyseius euterpes is a species of mite in the family Phytoseiidae.

References

euterpes
Articles created by Qbugbot
Animals described in 2001